Holcosus anomalus, also known commonly as Echternacht's ameiva, is a species of lizard in the family Teiidae. The species is endemic to Colombia.

Geographic range
H. anomalus is found in the Pacific lowlands of Colombia.

Habitat

Description
The ventral scales on the chest are granular, a character which is unique in its genus and in its subfamily (Teiinae).

Behavior
H. anomalus is terrestrial.

Reproduction
H. anomalus is oviparous.

References

Further reading
Castro-Herrera F, Vargas-Salinas F (2008). "Anfibios y reptiles en el departamento del Valle del Cauca, Colombia ". Biota Colombiana 9 (2): 251–277. (in Spanish, with an abstract in English).
Echternacht AC (1977). "A New Species of Lizard of the Genus Ameiva (Teiidae) from the Pacific Lowlands of Colombia". Copeia 1977 (1): 1–7. (Ameiva anomala, new species).
Harvey MB, Ugueto GN, Gutberlet RL (2012). "Review of Teiid Morphology with a Revised Taxonomy and Phylogeny of the Teiidae (Lepidosauria: Squamata)". Zootaxa 3459: 1–156. (Holcosus anomalus, new combination).
Ríos, Edwin Erick; Hurtado P., Carlos Felzer; Rengifo M., Jhon Tailor; Castro Herrera, Fernando (2011). "Lagartos en comunidades naturales de dos localidades en la región del Chocó de Colombia ". Herpetotropicos 5 (2): 85–92. (in Spanish, with an abstract in English).

abaetensis
Reptiles described in 1977
Taxa named by Arthur C. Echternacht